Rocket Streaming Audio Server (RSAS) is webserver for delivering live streaming audio over the internet. It receives live, compressed audio from a streaming audio encoder and delivers that audio to listeners connected to the server. RSAS was started as a drop-in replacement for Icecast, designed to overcome the performance limitations and other flaws in Icecast discovered while building the Radio Mast streaming audio CDN.

History
RSAS was developed in C++ by Albert Santoni in 2019 after difficulty scaling up the Icecast-based Radio Mast streaming audio CDN and dissatisfaction with the direction of Icecast development. Development of RSAS followed
the release of Rocket Broadcaster, a streaming audio encoder for Windows, in 2016.

Technical Details
RSAS is a webserver for distributing live streaming audio, available on Linux, Windows, and FreeBSD. It implements the HTTP, SOURCE, and HLS protocols,
as well as APIs from Icecast to provide compatibility with Icecast-related software, such as encoders. Encoders
connect by making an HTTP PUT request to a specific URL called a "mount", and upload live compressed audio. Listeners connect to the same URL using a player that makes an HTTP/HTTPS GET request and receives the live audio as a progressive download instead.

Created as a replacement for Icecast, RSAS is compatible with the configuration file format from Icecast 2.4.

In addition to supporting most Icecast features, RSAS provides additional functionality such as HLS support, improved AAC support, live streaming metadata, and ad insertion.

Performance
Touted as a high performance alternative to Icecast and Shoutcast, RSAS claims to support up to 1 million listeners
on a server. Benchmarks published in 2022 demonstrate RSAS serving up to 240,000 listeners simultaneously
on consumer-class hardware, limited only by CPU power and network bandwidth. As a webserver, RSAS has been demonstrated to 
serve regular files with speeds equivalent to nginx on Linux.

Support Formats and Protocols

See also
List of streaming media systems
SHOUTcast
Icecast
HTTP Live Streaming

References

Streaming software
Web server software